SPT-CL J0546-5345

is one of the most massive galaxy clusters ever found in the early universe. It is thought to be 7 billion light years away. It was discovered at the South Pole Telescope in 2008 by the Sunyaev-Zel'dovich-Effect. The cluster has a redshift of z=1.067.  Follow-up studies using the Spitzer, Chandra, and optical telescopes allowed to identify cluster members and to measure the redshift.  Using the velocity dispersion, the cluster mass has been estimated to 1015 solar masses.

See also
 SPT-CL J2106-5844

References 

Galaxy clusters
Pictor (constellation)